The First Presbyterian Church is a historic Presbyterian church at 212 East 1st Street in Atoka, Oklahoma, United States, that is listed on the National Register of Historic Places (NRHP).

It was built in a Romanesque style and was added to the NRHP in 2007.

See also

 National Register of Historic Places listings in Atoka County, Oklahoma

References

Presbyterian churches in Oklahoma
Churches on the National Register of Historic Places in Oklahoma
Romanesque Revival architecture in Oklahoma
Buildings and structures in Atoka County, Oklahoma
National Register of Historic Places in Atoka County, Oklahoma